Vasile Boerescu (January 1, 1830 – November 18, 1883) was a journalist, lawyer and Romanian politician who served as the Minister of Justice, Minister of Foreign Affairs, Minister of Religion and Public Instruction and held other various governmental offices during the existence of the United Principalities.

Early years
During the Wallachian Revolution of 1848, Boerescu was a student at Saint Sava National College in Bucharest and worked for a local newspaper. He graduated from college in 1850, and after a period of training at the School of Law in Bucharest, he moved to Paris where he obtained his license in 1855 and Ph.D. in Law in 1857. In October 1857, he also founded the newspaper Naționalul.

While in France, Boerescu promoted political rights of the Romanians under foreign prince. In 1857, after returning to Romania, he was hired as a professor of commercial law at the College of Saint Sava and in 1859 he started teaching law at the University of Bucharest. In March 1871, he became the rector of the University of Bucharest, but was shortly replaced by Ioan Zalomit. In October 1873, he became Dean of the Law Faculty.

Political career
In January 1859 he was elected a deputy to the Legislative Assembly of Wallachia. Boerescu served as the Minister of Justice in three terms from May 28 to July 5, 1860, from July 13, 1860, to April 14, 1861, and from November 16, 1868, until January 21, 1870. He was then appointed the Minister of Foreign Affairs serving two terms from April 28, 1873, until January 29, 1876, and from July 11, 1879, to April 9, 1881. As a foreign minister, he conducted a balanced foreign policy vis-à-vis Ottoman Empire and played an active role in unification of Moldavian and Wallachian principalities. Boerescu also held the office of Minister of Religion and Public Instruction from July 13 to October 17, 1860, and from January 9 to April 7, 1874), Head of State Board of Education in October 1863 and Vice Chairman of the State Council in 1864. In 1866 he was elected to the Parliament of Romania.

Boerescu died on November 18, 1883, in Paris. A street in Ploiești bears his name.

See also
Foreign relations of Romania

References

External links
 

1830 births
1883 deaths
Politicians from Bucharest
University of Bucharest alumni
Academic staff of the University of Bucharest
Rectors of the University of Bucharest
Romanian university and college faculty deans
Romanian Ministers of Justice
Romanian Ministers of Foreign Affairs
Romanian Ministers of Culture
Romanian Ministers of Education